Delavaya is a monotypic genus of shrub or small tree endemic to southwestern China and northern Vietnam. The sole species is Delavaya yunnanensis.

References 
 Franchet, Bull. Soc. Bot. France 33: 462. 1886.
 eFloras entry
 The Plant List entry
 JSTOR entry
 GBIF entry

Sapindaceae
Monotypic Sapindaceae genera